Gerardo Carrera Piñera (born 5 March 1987 in Gijón, Asturias), known simply as Gerardo, is a Spanish professional footballer who plays for SD Sarriana as an attacking midfielder.

External links

1987 births
Living people
Spanish footballers
Footballers from Gijón
Association football midfielders
Segunda División players
Segunda División B players
Tercera División players
Divisiones Regionales de Fútbol players
Sporting de Gijón B players
Atlético Malagueño players
Málaga CF players
UD Las Palmas players
Pontevedra CF footballers
AD Alcorcón footballers
CD Teruel footballers
CD Toledo players
Sestao River footballers
Barakaldo CF footballers
UD Somozas players